This is a list of Swedish television related events from 2011.

Events
25 March - The Fame singer Jessica Andersson and her partner Kristjan Lootus win the sixth season of Let's Dance.
5 June - Simon Danielsson wins the fifth season of Big Brother.
10 June - 17-year-old Rubik's Cube solver Simon Westlund wins the fifth season of Talang.
9 December - Amanda Fondell wins the sixth season of Idol.

Debuts
20 February - Big Brother Sverige (2000-2004, 2011-2012)

Television shows

2000s
Let's Dance (2006–present)

2010s
1-24 December - Tjuvarnas jul

Ending this year
Idol (2004-2011, 2013–present)
Talang (2007-2011, 2014–present)

Births

Deaths

See also
2011 in Sweden

References